This list comprises all players who have participated in at least one league match for New York Red Bulls II since the team's first USL season in 2015.

A
 Anatole Abang
 David Abidor
 Tyler Adams
 Wahab Ackwei
 Jose Aguinaga
 Bolu Akinyode
 Brandon Allen
 Amarildo de Souza

B
 Gideon Baah
 Jordan Bailon
 Tom Barlow
 Zaire Bartley
 Arun Basuljevic
 Dan Bedoya
 Vincent Bezecourt
 Justin Bilyeu
 Roy Boateng
 Alex Bobocea
 Stefano Bonomo
 Marcello Borges
 Samad Bounthong
 Rece Buckmaster

C
 Zach Carroll
 Santiago Castaño
 Cristian Cásseres Jr.
 Franklin Castellanos
 Jeciel Cedeno
 Alex Clay
 Caden Clark
 Deri Corfe
 Boima Cummins

D
 Ciaran Dalton
 Mike da Fonte
 Sean Davis
 Mason Deeds
 Niko de Vera
 Rafael Diaz
 Cherif Dieye
 Dilly Duka
 Kyle Duncan

E
 Steven Echevarria
 Daniel Edelman
 Mandela Egbo
 Sebastian Elney
 Marcus Epps
 Fidel Escobar
 Sal Esposito
 Derrick Etienne

F
 Joe Fala
 Omir Fernandez
 Junior Flemmings

G
 Chris Gloster

H
 Colin Heffron
 Kenan Hot

I
 Andreas Ivan

J
 Andrew Jean-Baptiste
 Mathias Jørgensen

K
 Preston Kilwien
 Jean-Christophe Koffi
 Ethan Kutler

L
 Jake LaCava
 Connor Lade
 Wallis Lapsley
 Bryce LeBel
 Chris Lema
 Scott Levene
 Luca Lewis
 Zeiko Lewis
 János Löbe
 Ethan Lochner
 Andrew Lombard
 Aaron Long
 Evan Louro

M
 Cheikh M'Baye
 Victor Manosalvas
 Henry Martin
 Douglas Martínez
 Conner Maurer
 Shawn McLaws
 Sean McSherry
 Ryan Meara
 Dan Metzger
 Roy Miller
 Ben Mines
 Ryan Mingachos
 Amando Moreno
 Michael Amir Murillo
 John Murphy
 Alex Muyl

N
 David Najem
 Hassan Ndam
 Sean Nealis
 Serge Ngoma
 Rashid Nuhu

O
 Marius Obekop
 Amobi Okugo
 Kevin O'Toole
 Karl Ouimette

P
 Damien Perrinelle
 Konrad Plewa
 Kevin Politz
 Noah Powder

R
 Tommy Redding
 Kyle Reynish
 Edgardo Rito
 Carlos Rivas

S
 Juan Sebastían Sánchez
 Manolo Sanchez
 Brian Saramago
 Jordan Scarlett
 Barry Sharifi
 Kazu Shigenobu
 Tapiwa Shumba
 Zoumana Simpara
 Tim Schmoll
 Omar Sowe
 Lucas Stauffer
 Leo Stolz
 Jared Stroud

T
 Amro Tarek
 Sean Teixeira
 Christopher Tiao
 Andrew Tinari
 Jamie Thomas
 John Tolkin
 Dantouma Toure
 Chris Tsonis

V
 Gonzalo Verón

W
 Anthony Wallace
 Brian White
 Devon Williams
 Shaun Wright-Phillips

Y
 Allen Yanes

Z
 Joseph Zalinsky
 Kyle Zajec
 Ronald Zubar

External links

New York Red Bulls II
 
Association football player non-biographical articles